Bandhan is an Urdu language PTV production in 1998. It is a romantic and love story drama. This drama is written by Bushra Rahman based on her own novel "Lagan" and "but Shikan". It was directed by Tariq Mairaj. Nadia Khan and Noman Masood play the lead couple. Bandhan was  massive hit and turned Nadia Khan an over night star. Both critically and commercially successful serial received several award nomination especially for Nadia Khan which she lost to Sania Saeed for "Aik thi Mehro". After few years PTV Home is Retelecasting Bandhan Daily at 3.00 P.M from 13th of june 2020

Plot 

Bandhan is a story of a spoiled rich girl who is the only child of her parents. She starts working for a family friend's office who eventually proposes her. She only agrees to marry him to teach him a lesson but after marriage they both realize the difference in their personalities. She leaves her husband's home and drags her father's business into bankruptcy. It is the time that both realize that they love each other however none of both takes a step back due to ego. It the time when their parents bring them both into senses and they reunite in the end.

Cast 
 Noman Masood
 Nadia Khan
 Farah Hussain
 Meenah Tariq
 Dr. Tariq Rahim
 Iqbal Hussain
 Naseem Qureshi
 Ayesha Yaseen

See also 
 Pakistan Television Corporation
 List of television programmes broadcast by PTV

References 

Urdu-language television shows
Pakistani drama television series
Pakistan Television Corporation original programming